Benthonellania acuticostata is a species of minute sea snail, a marine gastropod mollusc or micromollusc in the family Rissoidae.

Distribution
This species occurs in the Caribbean Sea, the Gulf of Mexico and the Lesser Antilles.

Description 
The maximum recorded shell length is 3.7 mm.

Habitat 
Minimum recorded depth is 59 m. Maximum recorded depth is 1249 m.

References

 Lozouet P. (1990). Benthonellania, nouveau genre de Rissoidae (Gastropoda, Prosobranchia) du bathyal atlantique. Bulletin du Muséum National d'Histoire Naturelle (section A Zoologie) (4) 12: 313-328 
 Rosenberg, G., F. Moretzsohn, and E. F. García. 2009. Gastropoda (Mollusca) of the Gulf of Mexico, Pp. 579–699 in Felder, D.L. and D.K. Camp (eds.), Gulf of Mexico–Origins, Waters, and Biota. Biodiversity. Texas A&M Press, College Station, Texas.

External links
 

Rissoidae
Gastropods described in 1889